Guy Edgar Campbell (October 9, 1871 – February 17, 1940) was a Democratic and Republican member of the U.S. House of Representatives from Pennsylvania.

Early life 

Guy E. Campbell was born in Fetterman, West Virginia, his father was an immigrant from Scotland. In 1889, he moved to Pennsylvania with his parents, who located in Pittsburgh, Pennsylvania, in 1889, and in Crafton, Pennsylvania, in 1893. He attended Iron City Business College at Pittsburgh. His brother Otto C Campbell, 10 years his junior, served as Street Commissioner of Crafton Borough.

Business Activities 

Campbell was employed as a clerk in the offices of the Baltimore & Ohio Railroad at Pittsburgh, until June 1896, when he resigned. He was engaged in the general insurance business in Pittsburgh until 1903. He was interested in the production of oil and gas in Pennsylvania and West Virginia.

United States House of Representatives 

Campbell was elected as a Democrat to the Sixty-fifth, Sixty-sixth, and Sixty-seventh Congresses, and as a Republican to the Sixty-eighth and to the four succeeding Congresses. He served as the Chairman of the United States House Committee on Expenditures in the Department of Labor during the Sixty-eighth Congress. He was an unsuccessful candidate for reelection in 1932. He became engaged in an advisory capacity in Washington, D.C. He died at Willoughby, Ohio. Interment in Union Dale Cemetery, Pittsburgh, Pennsylvania.

Sources 

 The Political Graveyard: Index to Politicians: Campbell, G to I at politicalgraveyard.com The Political Graveyard]

References 

1871 births
1940 deaths
American people of Scottish descent
People from Taylor County, West Virginia
Politicians from Pittsburgh
Baltimore and Ohio Railroad people
Republican Party members of the United States House of Representatives from Pennsylvania
Democratic Party members of the United States House of Representatives from Pennsylvania